Manzilein Apni Apni is an Indian television series that aired on Zee TV, based on the lives of two cousin brothers: Rahul and Ankush. The series is directed by known Indian film & television producer-director Anurag Basu.

Cast
 Prachi Shah as Priya
 Prabhat Bhattacharya as Prakash
 Jyoti Mukherjee as Shruti
 Indira Krishnan as Nanda
 Alka Kaushal as Smriti
 Dimple Ganguly
 Nitesh Pandey as Ankush
 Jayati Bhatia as Ruma
 Kali Prasad Mukherjee as Kali
 Uday Tikekar as Dinesh Roy
 unknown as Rahul
 unknown as Shankar
 unknown as Devvrat
 unknown as Deepak
 unknown as Dinesh & Deepak's father

References

External links
Manzilein Apani Apani Official Site on Zee Network

Zee TV original programming
Indian drama television series
Indian television soap operas
2001 Indian television series debuts